Odilia is a genus of nematode worms established by Marie-Claude Durette-Desset in 1973 that infect mostly murid rodents of the Australasian region (species of Melomys, Rattus and Uromys from mainland Australia and Tasmania.

Species include:

Odilia brachybursa (Mawson, 1961) (Host: Melomys, Australia)
Odilia emanuelae (Mawson, 1961) (Host: Rattus, Australia)
Odilia mackerrasae (Mawson, 1961) (Host: Melomys, Uromys, Australia) – type species
Odilia melomyos (Mawson, 1961) (Host: Melomys, Uromys, Australia)
Odilia tasmaniensis Gibbons & Spratt, 1995 (Host: Rattus, Tasmania)

References 

Heligmonellidae
Rhabditida genera
Parasitic nematodes of mammals
Parasites of rodents